Rupert Lockhart "Tommy" Thompson (May 19, 1910 – May 24, 1971) was an American outfielder in Major League Baseball who played for the Boston Braves (1933–36), Chicago White Sox (1938–39), and St. Louis Browns (1939). He was born in Elkhart, Illinois and died in Auburn, California.

In total he played 22 seasons of professional baseball beginning with the Bloomington Bloomers of the Illinois–Indiana–Iowa League in 1928. His best season may have been with the San Diego Padres of the Pacific Coast League in 1945, when he had a batting average of .346. His last professional season was with the Pampa Oilers of the West Texas–New Mexico League in 1953.

References

1910 births
1971 deaths
Chicago White Sox players
Hagerstown Hubs players
Major League Baseball outfielders
Baseball players from Illinois
People from Elkhart, Illinois
Albany Senators players
Bloomington Bloomers players
Buffalo Bisons (minor league) players
Chattanooga Lookouts players
Hagerstown Suns players
Hollywood Stars players
Kansas City Blues players
Magic Valley Cowboys players
Boston Bees players
Boston Braves players
Modesto Reds players
Newark Bears (IL) players
Pampa Oilers players
Portland Beavers players
Salt Lake City Bees players
San Diego Padres (minor league) players
St. Louis Browns players
Wenatchee Chiefs players
Youngstown Buckeyes players